Apposition is the quality of being side-by-side or next to each other, such as in:
Apposition, a grammatical construction in which two nouns are juxtaposed
Thumb apposition
Apposition eyes
Bone apposition in fractures
Apposition in embryo implantation